Eugerres is a genus of fish in the family Gerreidae, the mojarras. The genus was erected by David Starr Jordan and Barton Warren Evermann in 1927. They are native to the Atlantic and Pacific coasts of the Americas, occurring mainly in salt and brackish waters, but may enter fresh water. The genus also includes one strict fresh water species, E. mexicanus, native to southern Mexico and Guatemala (E. castroaguirrei is a junior of E. mexicanus)

Species
The currently recognized species in this genus are:
 Eugerres axillaris (Günther, 1864) (black axillary mojarra)
 Eugerres brasilianus (G. Cuvier, 1830) (Brazilian mojarra)
 Eugerres brevimanus (Günther, 1864) (short-fin mojarra)
 Eugerres lineatus (Humboldt, 1821) (streaked mojarra)
 Eugerres mexicanus (Steindachner, 1863) (Mexican mojarra) 
 Eugerres periche (Evermann & Radcliffe, 1917) (Periche mojarra)
 Eugerres plumieri (G. Cuvier, 1830) (striped mojarra)

References

Gerreidae
Taxa named by David Starr Jordan